Texas Chainsaw Massacre is a 2022 American slasher film directed by David Blue Garcia, with a screenplay by Chris Thomas Devlin, from a story by Fede Álvarez and Rodo Sayagues. It is the ninth installment of the Texas Chainsaw Massacre franchise. Set several decades after the original film, the story focuses on the serial killer Leatherface targeting a group of young adults and coming into conflict with a vengeful survivor of his previous murders. The project is a joint-venture production between Legendary Pictures, Exurbia Films, and Bad Hombre. The film stars Sarah Yarkin, Elsie Fisher, Mark Burnham, Moe Dunford, Nell Hudson, Jessica Allain, Olwen Fouéré, Jacob Latimore, and Alice Krige.

After the release of Leatherface in 2017, Lionsgate had plans for five more films in the franchise. However, the studio lost the rights due to the time it took to release it. Legendary acquired the franchise's rights, with  Álvarez and Sayagues serving as producers alongside Pat Cassidy, Ian Henkel, and Kim Henkel, who co-wrote the original film. Duo filmmakers Ryan and Andy Tohill were initially signed on as directors, but were replaced with Garcia due to creative differences. Filming took place in Bulgaria in August 2020.

Texas Chainsaw Massacre was released on February 18, 2022, on Netflix. The film received generally negative reviews from critics for its screenplay, lack of suspense and many critics considered it to be inferior to many of the other films in the franchise, although the performances received some praise.

Plot
Fifty years after Leatherface's killing spree in 1973, young entrepreneurs Melody and Dante, Melody's sister Lila and Dante's girlfriend Ruth travel to the abandoned Texas town of Harlow, to auction off old properties to create a trendy, heavily gentrified area. While inspecting a dilapidated orphanage, the group discover it is still occupied by an elderly woman called Ginny. When she claims she has papers to prove she still owns the property, an argument breaks out, briefly interrupted by a silent and towering man from upstairs.

Ginny then collapses from a heart attack and is rushed to the hospital, accompanied by Ruth and the man. An investor, Catherine, along with a group of potential buyers arrive in Harlow on a large bus, distracting Melody and Dante. Meanwhile, Lila strikes up a friendship with a local mechanic, Richter, and reveals she was a survivor of a school shooting, leaving her terrified of guns. Ginny dies en route to the hospital; Ruth texts Melody before the man goes berserk and murders the officers driving the ambulance, leading it to crash.

When Ruth awakes, she witnesses the man, revealed to be Leatherface, cutting off Ginny's face to wear as a mask. Ruth manages to radio for help before being killed by Leatherface, who makes his way back to Harlow. During a property auction, Melody reads Ruth's texts and prepares to leave with Lila. Richter overhears them talking about Ginny's death and takes their keys, agreeing to give them back once they provide proof they rightfully removed Ginny from her home. Melody and Dante return to the orphanage to find them.

Sally Hardesty, the sole survivor of Leatherface's previous killing spree and now a battle-hardened Texas Ranger, learns of Ruth's attack and heads out to investigate. At the orphanage, Melody discovers the papers and realizes that Ginny was wrongfully evicted. Leatherface arrives at the orphanage and attacks Dante, mutilating him. Melody hides as Leatherface retrieves his chainsaw from his bedroom. A thunderstorm hits Harlow as night falls, and Catherine and Lila take cover in the bus with the buyers. Dante manages to stumble out of the orphanage where he is discovered by Richter before bleeding to death. Richter enters the orphanage and is attacked and killed by Leatherface. Melody retrieves the car and bus keys from his body before fleeing the house, reuniting with Lila. They get on the bus, pursued by Leatherface who slaughters all of the people aboard, including Catherine.

Melody and Lila escape the carnage and come across Sally who locks them in her car before entering the orphanage to finally confront Leatherface. She holds him at gunpoint, demanding he remembers the pain he inflicted on her and her friends, but is met by only silence before Leatherface walks away. Leatherface then attacks the sisters in Sally's car but they are saved by Sally who shoots him. Sally gives Melody the keys to drive away before pursuing Leatherface. Leatherface ambushes and fatally injures Sally. Melody hits Leatherface with Sally's car before crashing into a nearby building; Melody is trapped but orders Lila to run away. When Leatherface appears,  Melody apologizes for what they did to Ginny. As he moves in to attack, Lila attempts to shoot him, but her gun is empty. Sally shoots him instead and he flees. Before dying, she encourages Lila not to run as she will be forever haunted by him as she was.

Lila then takes Sally's shotgun and pursues Leatherface into an abandoned building where she is ambushed and attacked. Melody arrives and takes Leatherface's chainsaw before using it to uppercut him, knocking him into a pool of water where he sinks to the bottom. They escape and Lila finds Sally's hat and puts it on before starting the morning drive back home.

Leatherface emerges, still alive, and drags Melody out of the car before decapitating her with his chainsaw in the middle of the street. A horrified Lila watches as the self-driving car takes her out of Harlow. 
Leatherface dances in the street with his chainsaw and Melody's head.

Cast
 Elsie Fisher as Lila, Melody's sister and an amateur photographer. She survived a school shooting, which left her with a traumatic injury.
 Sarah Yarkin as Melody, a San Francisco moneymaker who drags her sister with her to Texas on a business trip, out of fear of leaving her alone in the city
 Mark Burnham as Leatherface, a masked chainsaw-wielding murderer and a mainstay of the TCM franchise. Burnham was cast because of his imposing stature and physicality.
 Moe Dunford as Richter, a mechanic who befriends Lila
 Olwen Fouéré as Sally Hardesty, a Texas ranger and the only survivor of Leatherface's killing spree in 1973,Fouéré replaces original actress Marilyn Burns, who died in 2014.
 Jessica Allain as Catherine, an investor
 Jacob Latimore as Dante Spivey, a close friend of Melody and Lila
 Nell Hudson as Ruth, Dante's girlfriend
 Alice Krige as Virginia "Ginny" McCumber, the owner of Leatherface's current home
 William Hope as Sheriff Hathaway
 Jolyon Coy as Deputy
 Sam Douglas as Herb

Additionally, John Larroquette reprises his role as the film's narrator, having provided voice over for the original film, the 2003 remake and its prequel.

Production

Development
Initially during the development of Leatherface (2017), the producers had the film rights and intention to make five more Texas Chainsaw Massacre films. In April 2015, producer Christa Campbell stated that the fate of the potential sequels would largely depend on the financial and critical reception to Leatherface. By December 2017, Lionsgate and Millennium Films had lost the film rights, due to the amount of time it took to release Leatherface.

In August 2018, it was reported that Legendary Pictures had entered preliminary negotiations to purchase the film rights to Texas Chainsaw Massacre, with the studio intending to adapt television and film installments. The following year, Fede Álvarez signed onto the project as producer. In November 2019, Chris Thomas Devlin joined the production as screenwriter. In February 2020, Ryan Tohill and Andy Tohill were hired to serve as directors for the film, with Angus Mitchell signed on as cinematographer after collaborating on The Dig (2018). In May of the same year, it was announced that the film would serve as a sequel to the original film and feature a 60-year-old Leatherface, notably similar to the approach that Blumhouse Productions took with their Halloween films. In February 2022, Álvarez clarified that the events of the original sequels took place in the film's continuity.

Casting
In October 2020, it was announced that Elsie Fisher had been cast to star in the film alongside Sarah Yarkin, Moe Dunford, Alice Krige, Jacob Latimore, Nell Hudson, Jessica Allain, Sam Douglas, William Hope, and Jolyon Coy. In March 2021, it was revealed that Mark Burnham had been cast as Leatherface, replacing the late Gunnar Hansen, while Olwen Fouéré was cast as Sally Hardesty, replacing the late Marilyn Burns.

Filming
Production was initially slated to begin on May 4, 2020. Principal photography commenced on August 17, 2020, in Bulgaria. However, after being unimpressed with what was filmed, the studio fired Ryan and Andy Tohill. David Blue Garcia was hired to replace them as director. The footage shot by the Tohill brothers would not be used, with Garcia starting over on the production. Director of photography Angus Mitchell left the project along with the directors and was replaced by Ricardo Diaz. Garcia and Diaz were given a very short amount of time for preparation and worked off of "shorthands and bullet points", as well as their understanding of the first film. Garcia said it was a challenge to make Bulgaria look like Texas, but they leaned into the idea that it looked more like West Texas, near the Fort Davis mountains. Garcia praised production designer Michael Perry and set decorators Asen Bozilov and Joey Ostrander for building a good replica of a Texas town, even if there wasn't enough barbed wire to fully emulate Texas.

Post-production
By March 2021, Álvarez announced that production had completed, while confirming that the film would focus on an older-aged Leatherface. The filmmaker revealed that the production took an "old school" approach to filmmaking, noting vintage lenses and practical effects used for the gore. The following month, the film was officially titled Texas Chainsaw Massacre. It was believed at one point that the title had changed to Texas Chainsaw Begins but Devlin denied this. In May, it was reported that after test screenings, the audience reaction was generally negative. In August, Álvarez stated that overall audience response at test screenings was mostly positive, emphasizing that the film remains respectful to the first film's legacy.

That same month, it was revealed that Colin Stetson served as composer for the film.

Release
In October 2020, the film was initially stated for a theatrical release sometime in 2021. However, in August 2021, the film was revealed to skip a theatrical release and would instead be released exclusively on Netflix. In October 2021, during an "Ask Me Anything" (AMA) on the social media site Reddit, Álvarez stated that the film was most likely planned for an early 2022 release date. On December 3, 2021, a first look of the film was released, along with the announcement of its February 18 release date.

Reception

Audience viewership 
The film debuted at number two on Netflix's global charts during the week of its release—it was viewed by subscribers for 29.2 million hours. It ranked at number three on the global charts the further week. Five days after its release, the film still ranked at number one on Netflix's top 10 lists in the United States, Brazil, and Saudi Arabia, among other regions.

Critical response 
 

Valerie Complex for Deadline Hollywood wrote "The real horror here is the modernizing of the content by merging social media, social issues and Twitter buzz words in a careless fashion that makes it hard to latch onto anything substantial". For The A.V. Club, A.A. Dowd negatively compared the film to David Gordon Green's Halloween and said "Isn't it kind of arrogant to position your movie as the only proper follow-up to an iconic original and then make the same blunders as the films you're retconning?" Owen Glieberman of Variety called the film "a blood-soaked but unscary footnote." David Sims of The Atlantic said that the film "feels unnecessary and anonymous, leaning on crass visual shocks while failing to match the unsparing brutality of its lodestar." Jocelyn Noveck of the Associated Press gave the film 1/4 stars, writing: "Did we really need another? And sadly, given the lack of imagination, creativity or even basic attention to logic in a perfunctory and downright silly script, the answer seems a resounding "Nope."" Lauren Milici of Total Film remarked that the movie failed to honor the original, writing: "It's a formulaic film about a group of kids who get chased by a killer. Take Leatherface out of the equation and you could easily mistake it for any other horror."

Writing for TheWrap, William Bibbiani said "Garcia clearly knows that this is the film's ultraviolent slasher centerpiece, and he absolutely delivers on all that gory promise." Frank Scheck of The Hollywood Reporter wrote "Texas Chainsaw Massacre doesn't exactly offer anything new, but gorehound fans who rejoice at watching people's innards fall out of their bodies will find much to appreciate." Brad Wheeler of The Globe and Mail wrote: "Texas Chainsaw Massacre is what it says it is. You have your Texas, your chainsaw, your massacre." Benjamin Lee of The Guardian gave the film 3 out of 5 stars, describing it as "a jolting little slasher that should repulse and satisfy those with a suitably depraved idea of what they are clicking into." Jonathan Dehaan of Nightmare on Film Street said, "Texas Chainsaw Massacre is as violent and as blood-soaked as any of the sequels that came before it, even if it is without a defined purpose."

Themes and analysis
Following the film's release, many journalists and film critics commented on its themes of gun violence and gentrification, as well as minor commentary on social media and influencers. Lex Briscuso of Paste wrote that the film is "ultimately conservative in its messaging."

Brian Tallerico of RogerEbert.com interpreted the film as a cautionary tale against gentrification, as well as one plays with the concept of social media. Sonny Bunch of The Bulwark wrote that the film's protagonists, Gen Z social media influencers who move to a small Texas town, can be viewed as both "a plague of iPhone-carrying locusts" and sympathetic within the film's context. Cathy Gunning of Screenrant also believed the film tackled the topic of gentrification, though with less subtlety than the original. Elisa Guimarães of Collider wrote that the film satirizes everyone "from influences to bankers", and attempts to tackle the topics of "school shootings, gun control, gentrification, historical racism, [and] cancel culture", though the author believes it failed at doing so well. Guimarães believed much of the film's intended messaging was too vague, saying that it is unclear as to whether the film is pro-gun rights or pro-gun control, and accused the film of being "racist" for its scene involving several characters arguing over the presence of a Confederate flag. Kimberly Myles of the Los Angeles Times noted that the film dealt with "social commentary on school shootings, gentrification and racism", while being unsubtle about it. Sean O'Neal of Texas Monthly believed the film mocked "opportunistic hipsters" who move from California to Texas, while defending the local Texan rednecks, who are proven right in their suspicions. O'Neal also wrote that the film features an amusing and "ludicrous" scene, in which a group of party-goers record Leatherface on their phones, with one threatening to cancel him, before he proceeds to brutally murder them. The scene was generally perceived as a tongue-in-cheek mockery of cancel culture.

The film's producer, Fede Álvarez, stated in an interview with Collider that the film deals with the topics of gun violence and morality. Álvarez states that the film is intentionally vague and lacks exact clarity in its themes, as it was the filmmaker's intention to explore moral and political division:

"There's this theme, there's two sides of it. These people are wrong, these people are right,' because that's not how the world works for us. The world is a f*cking mess and [there's] shades of gray and there can be all sorts of characters in both sides of the story, so that's the way we approached it. We wanted you to walk out of it and go, 'Wait, but I still don't have an answer! Who was right and wrong?' Because that is the way that life works. I know that some movies do give you an answer and they take a strong point of view. For us, in something like Texas Chainsaw Massacre, it's the most gruesome horror movie, you've gotta be chaotic and it cannot be preachy. It's not school time."

The film's director, David Blue Garcia, said in an interview with Polygon that while the film had social commentary, he did not wish for the film to make "a statement" on political issues, and described the film's gun politics as "very nuanced."

Notes

References

External links
 
 

2022 films
2022 horror films
2020s serial killer films
2020s slasher films
American slasher films
American sequel films
English-language Netflix original films
Films about massacres
Films about sisters
Films not released in theaters due to the COVID-19 pandemic
Films produced by Fede Álvarez
Films produced by Kim Henkel
Films produced by Pat Cassidy
Films produced by Rodo Sayagues
Films set in 2023
Films set in Texas
Films shot in Bulgaria
Films with screenplays by Chris Thomas Devlin
Films scored by Colin Stetson
Legendary Pictures films
The Texas Chainsaw Massacre (franchise) films
Works about gentrification
2020s English-language films
2020s American films